Sandipan Bhagwan Thorat  (6 December 1932) was an Indian National Congress politician who was elected to the Lower House of Indian Parliament the Lok Sabha from Pandharpur, Maharashtra in 1977, 1980, 1984, 1989, 1991, 1996 and 1998.

References

External links
Official biographical sketch in Parliament of India website

India MPs 1977–1979
India MPs 1980–1984
India MPs 1984–1989
India MPs 1989–1991
India MPs 1991–1996
India MPs 1996–1997
India MPs 1998–1999
Lok Sabha members from Maharashtra
1932 births
Living people
Marathi politicians
People from Solapur district
Indian National Congress politicians from Maharashtra